In algebraic geometry, dévissage is a technique introduced by Alexander Grothendieck for proving statements about coherent sheaves on noetherian schemes. Dévissage is an adaptation of a certain kind of noetherian induction. It has many applications, including the proof of generic flatness and the proof that higher direct images of coherent sheaves under proper morphisms are coherent.

Laurent Gruson and Michel Raynaud extended this concept to the relative situation, that is, to the situation where the scheme under consideration is not necessarily noetherian, but instead admits a finitely presented morphism to another scheme. They did this by defining an object called a relative dévissage which is well-suited to certain kinds of inductive arguments. They used this technique to give a new criterion for a module to be flat. As a consequence, they were able to simplify and generalize the results of EGA IV 11 on descent of flatness.

The word dévissage is French for unscrewing.

Grothendieck's dévissage theorem 
Let X be a noetherian scheme. Let C be a subset of the objects of the category of coherent OX-modules which contains the zero sheaf and which has the property that, for any short exact sequence  of coherent sheaves, if two of A, A′, and A′′ are in C, then so is the third.  Let X′ be a closed subspace of the underlying topological space of X. Suppose that for every irreducible closed subset Y of X′, there exists a coherent sheaf G in C whose fiber at the generic point y of Y is a one-dimensional vector space over the residue field k(y). Then every coherent OX-module whose support is contained in X′ is contained in C.

In the particular case that , the theorem says that C is the category of coherent OX-modules. This is the setting in which the theorem is most often applied, but the statement above makes it possible to prove the theorem by noetherian induction.

A variation on the theorem is that if every direct factor of an object in C is again in C, then the condition that the fiber of G at x be one-dimensional can be replaced by the condition that the fiber is non-zero.

Gruson and Raynaud's relative dévissages 
Suppose that  is a finitely presented morphism of affine schemes, s is a point of S, and M is a finite type OX-module.  If n is a natural number, then Gruson and Raynaud define an S-dévissage in dimension n to consist of:
 A free finite type OT-module L and a homomorphism  such that  is bijective.
If n1, n2, ..., nr is a strictly decreasing sequence of natural numbers, then an S-dévissage in dimensions n1, n2, ..., nr is defined recursively as:
 An S-dévissage in dimension n1. Denote the cokernel of α by P1.
 An S-dévissage in dimensions n2, ..., nr of P1.
The dévissage is said to lie between dimensions n1 and nr. r is called the length of the dévissage. The last step of the recursion consists of a dévissage in dimension nr which includes a morphism . Denote the cokernel of this morphism by Pr. The dévissage is called total if Pr is zero.

Gruson and Raynaud prove in wide generality that locally, dévissages always exist. Specifically, let  be a finitely presented morphism of pointed schemes and M be an OX-module of finite type whose fiber at x is non-zero.

References

Bibliography 
 
 
 

Algebraic geometry
Theorems in geometry